The National Institute of Korean Language is a language regulator of the Korean language. It was created on January 23, 1991, by Presidential Decree No. 13163 (November 14, 1990). It is based in Seoul, South Korea.

The institute was originally founded at a non-governmental level as the Academy of the Korean Language in 1984. When the institute gained status as a subsidiary of the Korean Ministry of Culture, it was renamed National Academy of the Korean Language from 1991. It took its original name again in 2005.

External links
 Official website

National Institute of Korean Language
National Institute of Korean Language